The women's 3000 metres event at the 1986 Commonwealth Games was held on 27 July at the Meadowbank Stadium in Edinburgh.

Results

References

Athletics at the 1986 Commonwealth Games
1986